Banfield is an American late-night television program that airs Monday through Friday on NewsNation in the United States, hosted by long-time cable news journalist Ashleigh Banfield. It originally premiered on March 1, 2021, and is considered the flagship interview program on the NewsNation network.

Banfield was inspired by CNN's Larry King Live as a program which would seek to have a dialogue with guests, without interrogatory questions. Initially, Banfield said that most programs interview one guest, although multiple guests may be interviewed depending on events in the news. However, since the show has begun, most episodes feature two guests interviewed separately, or a panel focused on a theme.

Episodes

March 
</onlyinclude>

April
</onlyinclude>

May
</onlyinclude>

June
</onlyinclude>

References 

Lists of episodes